Lai Meng Chong (born 3 September 1951) is a Malaysian politician of Chinese descent from the town of Machap Baru in Malacca state. He is a member of the Malaysian Chinese Association (MCA), a major component party of the ruling Barisan Nasional (BN) coalition and holds the position of vice-chairman in the MCA's Alor Gajah division. Lai is also the political secretary to the Malaysian Minister of Human Resources, MCA vice-president and MP for Alor Gajah, Datuk Seri Dr Fong Chan Onn. He was nominated as the BN's candidate in the 2007 Machap by-election.

Election results

See also
 2007 Machap by-election
 Machap Jaya (state constituency)

Notes and references 

1951 births
Living people
People from Malacca
Malaysian politicians of Chinese descent
Malaysian Chinese Association politicians
Members of the Malacca State Legislative Assembly
Malacca state executive councillors